Euskirchen – Rhein-Erft-Kreis II is an electoral constituency (German: Wahlkreis) represented in the Bundestag. It elects one member via first-past-the-post voting. Under the current constituency numbering system, it is designated as constituency 92. It is located in southwestern North Rhine-Westphalia, comprising the Euskirchen district and part of the Rhein-Erft-Kreis district.

Euskirchen – Rhein-Erft-Kreis II was created for the inaugural 1949 federal election. Since 2009, it has been represented by Detlef Seif of the Christian Democratic Union (CDU).

Geography
Euskirchen – Rhein-Erft-Kreis II is located in southwestern North Rhine-Westphalia. As of the 2021 federal election, it comprises the entirety of the Euskirchen district as well as the municipalities of Brühl, Erftstadt, and Wesseling from the Rhein-Erft-Kreis district.

History
Euskirchen – Rhein-Erft-Kreis II was created in 1949, then known as Bergheim – Euskirchen. In the 1953 through 1961 elections, it was named Bergheim (Erft) – Euskirchen. In the 1965 through 1972 elections, it was named Bergheim (Erft). In the 1976 election, it was named Erftkreis II. In the 1980 through 2009 elections, it was named Euskirchen – Erftkreis II. It acquired its current name in the 2013 election. In the 1949 election, it was North Rhine-Westphalia constituency 5 in the numbering system. In the 1953 through 1961 elections, it was number 64. From 1965 through 1976, it was number 57. From 1980 through 1998, it was number 58. From 2002 through 2009, it was number 93. Since the 2013 election, it has been number 92.

Originally, the constituency comprised the districts of Euskirchen and Bergheim (Erft). In the 1976 election, it comprised the district of Euskirchen and the municipalities of Erftstadt, Bergheim, and Kerpen from the Erftkreis district. It acquired its current borders in the 1980 election. The Erftkreis district was renamed Rhein-Erft-Kreis in 2003, but the constituency's borders did not change.

Members
The constituency has been held continuously by the Christian Democratic Union (CDU) since its creation. It was first held by Johannes Even from 1949 to 1965, followed by Hans Verbeek and Karl Gatzen each for a single term. Peter Milz was elected in 1972 and served until 1987. Wolf Bauer then served until 2009. Detlief Sief was elected in 2009, and re-elected in 2013, 2017, and 2021.

Election results

2021 election

2017 election

2013 election

2009 election

References

Federal electoral districts in North Rhine-Westphalia
Constituencies established in 1949
1949 establishments in West Germany
Euskirchen (district)
Rhein-Erft-Kreis